Apamea nigrior, the black-dashed apamea or dark apamea, is a moth of the family Noctuidae. It is found from New Brunswick to Georgia, west to Indiana, north to Wisconsin and Ontario.

The wingspan is about 38 mm. Adults are on wing from May to July depending on the location.

External links
Images
Bug Guide

Apamea (moth)
Moths of North America
Moths described in 1891